Vinitsa Cove (‘Zaliv Vinitsa’ \'za-liv 'vi-ni-tsa\) is the 3.75 km wide cove indenting for 1.9 km Davis Coast in Graham Land, Antarctica east of Cape Page and west of Havilland Point. The cove is named after the settlement of Vinitsa in Southern Bulgaria.

Location
British mapping in 1978.

Maps
British Antarctic Territory. Scale 1:200000 topographic map. DOS 610 Series, Sheet W 64 60. Directorate of Overseas Surveys, Tolworth, UK, 1978.
 Antarctic Digital Database (ADD). Scale 1:250000 topographic map of Antarctica. Scientific Committee on Antarctic Research (SCAR), 1993–2016.

References
 Bulgarian Antarctic Gazetteer. Antarctic Place-names Commission. (details in Bulgarian, basic data in English)
Vinitsa Cove. SCAR Composite Antarctic Gazetteer.

External links
 Vinitsa Cove. Copernix satellite image

Coves of Graham Land
Davis Coast
Bulgaria and the Antarctic